Karreh-ye Sofla (also Romanized as Karreh-ye Soflá) is a village in Tut-e Nadeh Rural District, in the Central District of Dana County, Kohgiluyeh and Boyer-Ahmad Province, Iran. At the 2006 census, its population was 466, in 109 families.

References 

Populated places in Dana County